Zach Sang is an American radio DJ.

Early life 
Sang worked in a local grocery store when he began broadcasting from his parents' home in Wayne, New Jersey at 14 years old. Sang was interested in the local news and studied Al Roker and Bill Evans from ABC 7 in New York. He stated that the WPLJ radio station was one he loved and would listen to Scott & Todd every morning. Two stations would hold a summer softball game against each other that Sang would beg his mother to take him to so he would talk to the radio stars.

At 18 he went to college, but was asked to leave half a semester in.

Career 
He quickly amassed an online following from his home studio. Sang hosted "Zach Sang & The Student Body" on GOOM Radio, an online radio venture.  He served as the creator, executive producer and music director of Zang Radio, one of the biggest teen radio stations at the time. Zach currently hosts a weekend countdown that airs nationally in Canada on Rogers Media's Kiss Radio stations.

Over the course of his career, he has interviewed hundreds of celebrities including Justin Bieber, Miley Cyrus, Olivia Rodrigo, The Kid Laroi, Shawn Mendes, and most notably Ariana Grande who he's interviewed on several occasions including during his days on GOOM Radio. Sang's show aims to reach a mostly teen audience and encompasses games and interactive fun interviews with entertainers. Some games he has played with celebrities include "Hillary Clinton or Hilary Duff" when Hilary Duff was on the show, and "F, Marry or Kill" with actresses Maddison Brown and Liz Gillies. Sang looks up to Howard Stern and Elvis Duran for their skills on and off the air.

Zach Sang & The Gang/Zach Sang Show (2012-2022) 
In 2012, Sang launched a terrestrial radio show called "Zach Sang and The Gang" with WYD Media and Westwood One alongside Dan Zolot, Heather "Heff" Connor, and Shelley Rome. It rebranded as the "Zach Sang Show" in March 2016, Shelley Rome left the show for Z100 and was replaced by Jill Gutowitz. The show was heard live every night on over 70 stations in The United States and 13 in Canada, and for its first years was based in The CBS Broadcast Center before moving to the Westwood One studios in Los Angeles. The show, which focused its audience towards 12-34 year olds, aired weekdays from 7pm-midnight, and a 4-hour weekend version of the show featuring a compilation of segments aired in the past week was available at one point. Years later Jill and Heather left, they would eventually be replaced by Ricki Sanchez and Bargain Blaire who would both leave the show in late 2020 and 2021. There were also YouTube and digital placements made of interviews that reach a wider audience. 95SX's Johnny O filled in for Zach for the first two weeks of 2022 before Westwood One ended Zach's show after ten years.

On March 1, 2022, Zach posted a new logo for his show and teased its revival on his Twitter account which was later reposted on the show's Twitter, Facebook, and Instagram accounts. The following week, Zach announced that his show would move to an Amazon-based audio service called Amp and that new celebrity interviews would still be posted on the show's YouTube account, the first of them being 5 Seconds of Summer.

Former Segments 

 The Newsfeed: Dan's hourly entertainment report
 Tell Me More: Dan reads a headline in a "fill-in-the-blank" format" and a listener would finish it
 Ghostbusters: A listener would call Zach to help them with their ghosting
 The Mix: The last hour of the show, hosted by Diplo, then DJCo1
 Savings with Bargain Blaire: Weekly savings from nationwide retailers and corporations announced by "Bargain Blaire"
 The Great Loudini: Zach's pug Lou would predict football games by setting up two bowls of dog food, each with the teams that would play in an upcoming game
 Hashtaging: Zach would give a hashtag correlating to a topic discussed on air, listeners would respond using the hashtag on Facebook or Twitter
 The Top 5 at 9: The 5 most requested songs during the show. At one point it was the top 5 songs on the Billboard Hot 100
 Hot Take: Either Zach, Dan, or Heather would give an unpopular opinion and listeners would respond if they agree or disagree and why
Best of Interviews: Quick spot that would promote one of Zach's interviews. Aired during Zach's vacation days in place of The Newsfeed
Who Said It?: Devised by a listener named Haylee, who would give Zach a quote from a celebrity and he would guess which celebrity said it. The game would later be hosted by co-host Heather.
Bad Joke Thursdays: Zach Dan, Heather, and the listeners would recite "bad jokes" and the three best ones were tallied by the end of the show's fourth hour
Freestyling: Zach, Dan, and Heather's attempt in rapping about topics given by listeners, aired in the first and fourth hours of the Friday show

Personal life 
Zach is a member of the LGBTQ community, identifying as queer in 2020. Zach also adopted a French Bulldog named Lou in 2019. He has a sister Mackenzie Sang and he became an uncle in 2021.

References 

21st-century American LGBT people
American talk radio hosts
American LGBT broadcasters
Living people
Year of birth missing (living people)
People from Wayne, New Jersey